Digvijay Stadium (Hindi: दिग्विजय स्टेडियम)  is an international multi-sports stadium in Rajnandgaon, India. The ground is mainly used for organizing matches of football, cricket and other sports as well.

The stadium was later demolished for major renovations; and then was inaugurated to public on October 4, 2018.

Match history 
The stadium has hosted four first-class matches  in 1988 when Madhya Pradesh cricket team  played against Rajasthan cricket team . The ground hosted three more first-class matches from 1997 to 1999. The stadium also hosted a List A matches when Madhya Pradesh cricket team played against Uttar Pradesh cricket team but since then the stadium has not hosted any cricket matches.

See also 
 Rajnandgaon International Hockey Stadium

References

External links 

 cricketarchive
 cricinfo
 Wikimapia

Cricket grounds in Chhattisgarh
Sports venues in Rajnandgaon
Sports venues in Chhattisgarh
Rajnandgaon
Defunct cricket grounds in India
Sports venues completed in 1988
1988 establishments in Madhya Pradesh
20th-century architecture in India